Now You See Love, Now You Don't is a 1992 Hong Kong comedy film written and directed by Mabel Cheung and Alex Law.

In this film, the chief character, played by Chow Yun-fat, who himself grew up in Lamma Island, consistently speaks the Waitau language.

Cast
 Chow Yun-fat as Ng Shan-shui
 Carol Cheng as Firefly Kwok
 Teresa Mo as Dotty
 Carina Lau as Susan Chong
 Anthony Wong as Dunno
 Chan Fai-hung as Mr. Lam
 Wing Lam
 Lowell Lo as Piano player (cameo)
 Tam Sin-hung as Shan-shui's mother
 Richard Ng as English teacher (cameo)
 David Wu
 Ricky Shin as Kid in ice skating rink
 Chan Kit-ling (cameo)
 Lawrence Ah Mon (cameo)
 Yu Li (cameo)
 Dennis Chan as Man wearing hat (cameo)
 Tina Lau (cameo)
 Echo (cameo)
 Philip Chan (cameo)
 Irene Wan as Canoe girl (cameo)
 Joseph Cheng (cameo)
 Peter Lai (cameo)
 Bowie Lam as Waiter (cameo)
 Eric Chan (cameo)
 Fruit Chan as Policeman (cameo)
 Ng Kwok-kin as Policeman (cameo)
 Poon Hang-sang as No Teeth (cameo)
 Lo Fan as Big woman in red (cameo)
 So Tak-wa
 Simon Cheung as Policeman
 Terence Chang as Firefly's boss (cameo)

Accolades

External links
 
 

1992 films
1992 comedy films
Hong Kong comedy films
1990s Cantonese-language films
Films set in Hong Kong
Films shot in Hong Kong
Films directed by Alex Law
1990s Hong Kong films